Roessner is a surname. Notable people with the surname include:

Michaela Roessner (born 1950), American science-fiction writer
Stephen Roessner (born 1981), American recording engineer, musician, multi-instrumentalist, and producer 
Ute Roessner (born 1971), German-Australian plant biochemist

See also
Roessler
Rossner